The Marshall Brothers are a Dutch/American rock band. 
They were the backing band for Andre Williams during his European tours in 2005 and 2006. Without American keyboard player Skip Marshall but with Canadian guitar player Dr Tom Marshall and American drummer Cpt Killdrums Marshall they occasionally also form Dutch rock band Atilla the Hun and the Quality Butchers.

The self-titled album peaked at number 69 in Australia in May 1975.

References

External links
 TJ-Concerts site
 Pravda Records site
 Review of Augsburg show on oct. 2nd 2006 (in German)
 Review of Belgrade show on sept. 30th 2006 (in Serbian)

Dutch rock music groups